Jazz music has been popular in France since the 1920s. Its international popularity peaked in the 1930s, and it has been continually enjoyed since.

History
Following World War I, a number of American expatriates settled in Paris and began to build up a jazz scene. France did not suffer from racial discrimination as much as the US, so a mixture of musical styles from different cultures began to emerge.
As with Brazil, the French were at first concerned it was too American of an influence before "making it their own." Although in the case of the French the adjustment proved faster as by the 1930s jazz had become acceptable. Between the 1930s and 1950s, the biguine, a style of jazz from the French Caribbean was popular among dance orchestras. Lacking recognition at home, several biguine artists from Martinique moved to mainland France, where they achieved greater popularity in Paris, especially in the wake of the colonial exhibition in 1931. Early stars like Alexandre Stellio and Sam Castandet became popular in Paris. An important event in that is the creation of the Quintette du Hot Club de France in 1934. This is among the most significant jazz groups in European history. 

Starting in the late 1940s the Le Caveau de la Huchette would become an important place for French and American jazz musicians. Many American jazz artists have lived in France from Sidney Bechet to Archie Shepp. These Americans would have an influence on French jazz, but at the same time French jazz had its own inspirations as well. For example, Bal-musette had some influence on France's form of Gypsy jazz. Similarly, the violin, and to an extent the guitar, were traditionally more popular in French jazz than American. Related to that, Jean-Luc Ponty and Stéphane Grappelli are among the most well-respected violinists in the history of jazz. That stated, the violin is also popular in Eastern European jazz.

French jazz musicians
Sophie Alour
Django Reinhardt
Franck Amsallem
Josephine Baker 
Lionel Belmondo
Michel Benita
Airelle Besson
Claude Bolling
Laurent Coulondre
Benoit Delbecq
David El Malek
Laika Fatien
Richard Galliano
Jef Gilson
Stéphane Grappelli 
Olivier Hutman
Christian Jacob
Michel Graillier 
Michel Legrand
Didier Lockwood
Eddy Louiss
Jacques Loussier
Bernard Lubat
Ibrahim Maalouf
Pierre Michelot 
Alain Mion
Francois Moutin
Leila Olivesi
Xavier Desandre Navarre
Vincent Peirani
Michel Petrucciani
Guillaume Perret
Jean-Michel Pilc
Jean-Luc Ponty
Michel Portal
Henri Renaud
Louis Sclavis
Martial Solal
Jacky Terrasson
Scott Tixier
Baptiste Trotignon
Erik Truffaz
René Urtreger 
Maurice Vander
Christian Vander
Barney Wilen

Jazz festivals in France
Banlieues Bleues in Seine-Saint-Denis
Blues Passions Cognac in Cognac
Europa Jazz Festival in Le Mans
Festival International Django Reinhardt in Samois sur Seine
Jazz à Juan in Antibes
Jazz aux Remparts in Bayonne
Jazz à Vienne in Vienne 
Jazz en tête in Clermont-Ferrand 
Jazz in Marciac in Marciac 
Jazz sous les pommiers in Coutances
Jazz sur son 31 in Toulouse
JVC Jazz Festival in Paris
La Villette Jazz Festival in Paris
Les nuits du Jazz in Nantes
Musiques Métisses in Angoulème
Musiques de Jazz et d'ailleurs in Amiens
Nancy Jazz Pulsations in Nancy
Nice Jazz Festival in Nice
Paris Jazz Festival in the Bois de Vincennes
Reims Jazz Festival in Reims
Sons d'hiver in Val-de-Marne
Tourcoing Jazz Festival in Tourcoing
Uzeste Musical in Uzeste

References
Citations

Sources

Further reading